This is a list of soccer leagues that are affiliated with Region I of the United States Adult Soccer Association.

Connecticut 
Men's leagues 
 Adult Soccer League of Connecticut
 Connecticut Adult Recreational Soccer League
 Connecticut Soccer League
 CSSA U-23 Summer Soccer League
 Farmington Valley Adult Soccer Club
 New Canaan Men's Soccer Club
 Shoreline Adult Soccer League
 Southern New England Adult Soccer League
Women's leagues
 Connecticut Women's Summer Soccer League
 Eastern Connecticut Women's Soccer Club
 Nutmeg Women's Soccer League
 Southern Connecticut Women's Soccer League
 West Hartford Women's Soccer Club

District of Columbia and Virginia

Virginia 
 Arlington Coed Kicks (ACK)
 Braddock Road Adult Soccer League (BRASL)
 Men's 7 v. 7
 Burke Athletic Club (BAC)
 Men's 8 v. 8
 Central Virginia Soccer Association (CVSA)
 Men's
 Women's
 Coed
 Master's Division Men's Over 40
 Churchland Soccer League (CSL)
 Coed
 Men's
 Commonwealth Soccer League (CommSL)
 Coed
 11 v. 11
 7 v. 7
 Men's
 Commonwealth Women's Soccer Association (CWSA)
 Women's
 Masters Division Over 35
 Culpeper Soccer Association (CSA)
 Coed 7 v. 7
 Fauquier County Adult Soccer League (FCASL)
 Coed 7 v. 7
 Coed 8 v. 8
 New River United Soccer Association (NRUSA)
 Coed
 Northern Virginia Adult Soccer Association (NVASA)
 Coed
 Coed Masters Division
 Women Over 30
 Men Over 35
 Northern Virginia Soccer Club (NVSC)
 Northern Virginia Soccer League (NVSL)
 Coed
 Men's
 Masters Division
 Over 30
 Over 40
 Northern Virginia Women's Soccer League (NVWSL)
 Women's Over 40
 Portsmouth Soccer Club (PSC)
 Coed 7 v. 7
 Richmond Strikers Soccer Club
 Coed 7 v. 7
 Masters Division Over 40
 Roanoke Adult Soccer League (RASL)
 Coed
 Shipp's Corner Soccer Club (SCSC)
 Men's Over 30
 Men's Over 40
 Soccer Organization of Charlottesville / Albemarle  (SOCA)
 Coed
 Men's
 Women's
 Southeastern Virginia Women's Soccer Association (SEVWSA)
 Women's
 Coed
 Tidewater Women's Soccer League (TWSL)
 Women's
 Masters Over 30 Division
 Virginia Rush-Hampton League (VA RUSH-Peninsula)
 Coed
 Men's
 Women's
 Warren County Adult Soccer League (WCASL)
 Coed 7 v. 7

Washington, D.C. 
 Capital Coed Soccer League (CCSL)
 Washington Area Women's Soccer League (WAWSL)
 Women's
 Women's Over 30
 Washington Premier League (WPL)
 Men's

Massachusetts 
 Bay State Soccer League
 Massachusetts State Soccer League
 USAfrica Soccer League
 Central Mass Twilight Soccer League
 New England Over-The-Hill Soccer League
 Central Mass Over 35 Soccer League

New Jersey 
 Cosmopolitan Soccer League
 Garden State Soccer League
 Italian American Soccer League of New Jersey
 North Jersey Soccer League

New York

East New York 
Affiliated leagues for the Eastern New York State Soccer Association: 

 Big Apple Soccer League
 Capital District Soccer League
 Central New York State Soccer League
 Cosmopolitan Soccer League [1]
 East Hudson Youth Soccer League
 Eastern District Soccer League
 Hudson Valley Youth Soccer League
 Intra-American Junior Soccer League
 Long Island Soccer League
 Metrokids Inter-Regional Soccer League
 Mid State New York Soccer League
 New York Metropolitan Women's Soccer League
 Staten Island Soccer League
 Westchester Youth Soccer League

West New York 
Buffalo District Soccer League

Pennsylvania

East Pennsylvania 
United Soccer League

West Pennsylvania

West Virginia 
 Southern West Virginia Adult Soccer League

Multi-State 
 Eastern Premier Soccer League

References and Notes

External links 
 USASA
 List of USASA Region I affiliated leagues

Region I